The history of Christianity in Hungary started in the Roman province of Pannonia, centuries before the arrival of the Magyars, or Hungarians.

Antiquity and Early Middle Ages

Roman Pannonia 

Celtic, Illyrian, Iranian and Dacian tribes inhabited the lands now forming Hungary in Classical Antiquity. The Romans forced the tribes of Transdanubiathe western region of present-day Hungaryinto submission between 35BC and 9AD. The region was incorporated in the Roman province of Pannonia. In the 290s, Transdanubia was divided between two new provinces, Pannonia Prima and Valeria.

The natives' religion is poorly documented. The Romans erected shrines to their gods and introduced mystery cults. A Christian presence can certainly be documented from the 2ndcentury. A decorated casket-mount depicting the marriage at Cana and other scenes from the Bible was unearthed at Intercisa (now Dunaújváros). The first Christians were immigrants, particularly from Syria, Italy and Greece. Most of them had Greek names. One of the earliest tombstones with a Christian inscription"Live in God"was erected for Aurelius Iodorus, "a Greek citizen from Laodicea area", and his two children in Savaria (now Szombathely). No Christian churches dated before the 4thcentury have been unearthed, implying that Christian liturgy was celebrated in private homes.

The Diocletianic Persecution did not severely affect the local Christian communities. No martyrs are known, although Bishop Quirinus of Sescia was publicly executed in Savaria in 303. Emperor Constantine the Great's Edict of Milan consolidated the Christians' position in 313. Christian cemeteries, separated from the pagans' necropolises, developed near the towns and the fortresses. The use of fibulae decorated with crosses or "Chi Rho"-monograms spread, although they do not necessarily evidence their owners' Christian faith because Christianity was developing into a state religion during this period. None of the towns of Pannonia Prima and Valeria are documented as episcopal sees, but historian András Mócsy proposes that bishoprics must have existed in the provincial capitals, Sopianae (present-day Pécs) and Savaria. Ambrose, Archbishop of Milan, wrote that Arianisma doctrine condemned as heresy at the First Council of Nicaeaspread in Pannonia Valeria in the 4thcentury.

Barbarian incursions forced significant part of the local Romanized population to flee from Pannonia in the 5thcentury. Christians who fled from Scarbantia (now Sopron) took Bishop Quirinus's relics from Savaria to Rome around 408. Other Christian groups survived in Pannonia. Anthony the Hermit was born in Valeria and he left the province only after his parents' death. Martin, who was to become archbishop of Braga, was also born in Pannonia.

Migration period 

The Huns crossed the Volga River from the east and forced large groups of Alans and Goths to abandon their homelands in the Pontic steppes. Hun, Alan and Goth troops pillaged Pannonia for the first time in the winter of 379–380. The Romans allowed the Marcomanni to settle in Pannonia Prima when their queen, Fritigil, converted to Christianity around 396. The Huns' center of power was transferred to the lowlands along the Middle Danube in the 420s, but their empire collapsed after the Germanic and Iranian subject peoples defeated them in the Battle of Nedao in 454. The Gepids took control of the lands to the east of the river Tisza and the Romans allowed the Ostrogoths to settle in Pannonia. In the early 470s, the Ostrogoths left for Italy and less powerful Germanic peoples, like the Heruli and Suebi, seized parts of Pannonia. The Lombards occupied the province in the 500s.

The Gepids' conversion to Christianity started in the second half of the 4thcentury. Archaeological finds proving the survival of Germanic paganism abound, but the aristocrats were buried with reliquiaries, indicating their adherence to the cult of saints. The Gepids adhered to Arianism. The Lombards came into contact with Arian missionaries in the 490s, but their pagan funerary rites survived. They placed food and drink in the graves and buried their warriors with their hunting dogs and weapons. Arianism became their dominant religion in the 560s, preserving their separation from their Catholic subjects. Nicetius, Bishop of Trier, addressed a letter to Chlothsind, the Catholic wife of King Alboin of the Lombards, unsuccessfully urging her to convert her husband to Catholicism in the winter of 565–566.

The Avarsa large coalition of steppe peoplesinvaded the Gepids' land and forced them into submission in 567. A year later, the Lombards voluntarily left Pannonia for Italy, accompanied by Gepid, Saxon, Suebian and Romanized groups. The Avars were pagans who swore by the "God in heavens", or Tengri. They always placed large quantities of grave goods in the graves; Avar males were buried together with their horse or its parts. The Avars encouraged the Slavs to settle on the fringes of their empire, contributing to their expansion. Columbanus was the first missionary to be contemplating proselytizing among the Avars and the Slavs around 610. He quickly abandoned the idea after realizing that "progress in faith for this people was not ready to hand". Bishop Emmeram of Regensburg was also planning to visit the Avars, but Bavarian officials dissuaded him from crossing the border.

A Christian community, the bearers of the Keszthely culture, flourished in the region of a former Roman fortress at Keszthely in the Avar Khaganate. The local basilica with three apses was used and possibly reconstructed in the second half of the 6thcentury. The community leaders were buried in the basilica or in the nearby cemetery. A wealthy woman buried in the cemetery wore a silver garment pin with the inscription BONOSA, tentatively identified as her name. The origin of the community is uncertain, with some scholars regarding them as the descendants of the local Romanized population, others identifying them as Byzantine prisoners of war. Historian Walter Pohl proposes that the culture developed through the cohabitation of local Christians and immigrants from various lands. The fortress and the basilica were destroyed, most probably during a civil war around 630. The community survived the destruction of the fortress and new cemeteries developed in the region, but their distinctive culture quickly disappeared.

The Avars supported Charlemagne's opponents, provoking a Frankish military campaign in 791. A civil war broke out in the khaganate and a high-ranking Avar dignitary, the tudun, sent envoys to Charlemagne, offering his conversion to Christianity. The bishops who accompanied Charlemagne's son, Pepin the Hunchback, to a military campaign against the Avars held a synod on the Danube in 796. Under the direction of Patriarch Paulinus II of Aquileia, they discussed the methods of the Avars' conversion, describing them as an illiterate and irrational people. They emphasized that the Avars could not be converted by force. The missionary territories were distributed between the sees of Aquilea and Salzburg before 811. The lands north of the river Dráva came under the jurisdiction of the archbishops of Salzburg.

The Avars resisted the Franks and many of them left Transdanubia to settle east of the Tisza. Slavic tribes made raids against the Avars, forcing one of their leaders, the kapkhan Theodore, who was Christian, to seek assistance from the Franks. He and his people were settled in the lands between Savaria and Carnuntum. The Avar khagan converted to Christianity and received the name Abraham on 21 September 805. A Byzantine list of the dioceses, compiled probably between 806 and 815, mentions the Avars among the Christian peoples under the popes' jurisdiction. The Avars' power quickly disintegrated and no Avar dignitaries were mentioned after 821. Cemeteries testify to the survival of the traditional Avar burial rites in southwest Transdanubia until the 830s.

Carolingian Age

Transdanubia was integrated in the administrative system of the Carolingian Empire between 796 and 828. The see of Salzburg ceded the lands to the west of the river Rába to the bishopric of Passau and both prelates appointed suffragan bishops to direct the conversion in Pannonia. A pagan aristocrat, Pribina, whom the Moravians had expelled from his lands, sought refuge in the Carolingian Empire in 833. He was baptised on the order of King Louis the German who also granted him estates on the river Zala. Pribina built a fortress, Mosapurc, in the swamps near Lake Balaton (at present-day Zalavár) and settled Slavic, Bavarian and Swabian colonists in his estates. The Saxon wandering priest, Gottschalk, visited Pannonia in early 848, shortly before his teaching about predestination was condemned as heresy at a synod in Mainz. A baptistery must have existed in Mosapurc already in the late 840s and Liupramm, Archbishop of Salzburg, consecrated a church in the town on 24January 850. A three-aisled basilica, dedicated to St Adrian, was built in Mosapurc around 855.

Pribina died fighting against the Moravians and his son, Kocel, succeeded him in 861. Adalwin, Archbishop of Salzburg, did not appoint suffragan bishops from around 863. Kocel met the Byzantine missionary brothers, Constantine and Methodius, during their journey from Moravia to Rome in 867. Constantinethe future St Cyrilhad constructed a special alphabet for the Slavic languages and developed a Slavic liturgy. Kocel learnt the new script and entrusted the brothers with the education of 50disciples. Pope Hadrian II approved the Slavic liturgy and Methodius returned to Mosapurc in 869. Kocel persuaded the Pope to make Methodius bishop of the "see of St Andronicus", limiting the jurisdiction of the archbishops of Salzburg.  To defend the interests of the Salzburg see against Methodius, an unidentified cleric compiled a historical work, the Conversion of the Bavarians and the Carantanians  around 870. Bishop Ermanrich of Passau arrested Methodius and a synod of the Bavarian prelates ordered Methodius' imprisonment for his interference in Transdanubian church affairs. Methodius' pupils had to flee from Kocel's domains. Pope John VIII achieved Methodius' release early in 873, but Methodius could not return to Transdanubia. After Kocel died around 875, Arnulf of Carinthia seized his domains. The St Adrian Basilica was rebuilt in Mosapurc during his rule.

Cemeteries display the traits of Christianization of Pannonia from the 830s. Commoners were still buried near sacred groves, but the orientation of their graves became consequently west–east. The offerings of food and drink almost disappeared from their graves in 860s. The rulers' retainers were buried in new cemeteries near the churches. The Conversion lists more than 30churches in Pannonia. It also refers to Christian Avars who paid tax to the royal treasury.

Pagan Magyars 

Coming from the region of the Ural Mountains, the Magyars settled in the Pontic steppes before the late 830s. They were among the subject peoples of the Khazar Khaganate for an uncertain period, but from the mid-9th-century they acted as an independent power. Ahmad ibn Rustah, Abu Sa'id Gardezi and other medieval Muslim geographers who preserved earlier scholars' records of the 9th-century Magyars described them as star- and fire-worshipers. Al-Bakri added that the 10th-century Magyars worshipped the "Lord of the Sky" whom modern historians associate with Tengri. Later prohibitions in Christian legislation indicate that sacrifices made at sacred groves and springs were important elements of the pagan Magyars' cult. The mutilation of corpses is well-documented in pre-Christian cemeteries, implying a fear of the return of spirits.

The Magyars came into contact with Muslims, Jews and Christians, but all theories on their influence on the Magyars' religious life are speculative. The hagiographic Life of Constantine mentions that the future St Cyril run into a band of Magyar warriors in the Crimea in 860. They wanted to kill him, but his prayers allegedly convinced them to spare his life.

The Magyars were regularly hired by their neighbors to intervene in their conflicts. The Byzantine Emperor Leo the Wise incited them to invade Bulgaria in 894, but the Bulgarians made an alliance with the Pechenegs. The Pechenegs attacked the Magyars from the east, forcing them to abandon the Pontic steppes. They crossed the Carpathian Mountains and settled in the plains along the Middle Danube around 895. They conquered Pannonia, destroyed Moravia and defeated the Bavarians between 900 and 907. Theotmar, Archbishop of Salzburg, recorded that they destroyed Christian churches in Pannonia.

Middle Ages

Towards conversion 

Part of the local population survived the Magyar conquest and the Magyars captured Christians during their raids in Europe, but the role of the local Christians and the Christian prisoners in the Magyars' conversion is undocumented. Significant elements of the Christian vocabulary of the Hungarian language were borrowed from local Slavic idioms. A sabretache decorated by a Greek cross, mythical animals and palmettes, found in a grave at Tiszabezdéd, may reflect Christian influence or religious syncretism, but the dead warrior was put in the grave together with his horse, in accordance with pagan practices.

A paramount chieftain (or grand prince), always a member of the Árpád dynasty, ruled the Hungarians in the 10thcentury. The Árpáds were believed to have descended from a legendary bird of prey, called the turul. The Byzantine Emperor Constantine Porphyrogennetos also wrote of two high-ranking Hungarian dignitaries, the gyula and the harka, around 950. Central authority was weak and the heads of the Magyar tribes pursued independent foreign policy. Magyar chieftains visited Constantinople and some of them converted to Christianity to facilitate the negotiations. The harka Bulcsú received baptism in 948, but he never became a devout Christian. The gyula was baptised around 950. Patriarch Theophylact of Constantinople consecrated the monk Hierotheos as bishop of Tourkia (or Hungary) to accompany the gyula back to his domains in eastern Hungary. The late-11th-century Byzantine historian John Skylitzes claimed that Hierotheos had converted many Hungarians, but archaeological finds do not substantiate a mass conversion to Orthodox Christianity.

A member of the Árpád dynasty, Termachu, was one of the Hungarian leaders visiting Constantinople in 948, but Hungarian raids against the Byzantine Empire resumed after the Germans defeated the Magyars in the Battle of Lechfeld in 955. Grand Prince Géza decided to establish close relationships with Hungary's western neighbors in the early 970s. According to modern historians, he either wanted to stabilize Hungary's position in a period of Byzantine–German alliance, or he knew that he could only be second in the Byzantine court behind the gyula. Pope John XI had already sent a missionary bishop, Zacheus, to Hungary in the early 960s, but the Pope's opponent, Holy Roman Emperor Otto I captured Zacheus at Capua. A Benedictine monk, Wolfgang, left the Einsiedeln Abbey to proselytize among the Hungarians in 972, but Piligrim, Bishop of Passau, forbade him to leave his diocese. In the same year, Emperor OttoI dispatched one Bishop Bruno to Hungary. Modern historians tentatively associate Bruno with "Bishop Prunwart" whom the necrology of the Abbey of Saint Gall credited with the baptism of Géza and many of his subjects. Bishop Adalbert of Prague also come to Hungary, but his mission was not successful, according to his nearly contemporaneous Life.

Géza and his wife, Sarolt, remained half-pagans. Thietmar of Merseburg recorded that Géza offered sacrifices to pagan gods even after his baptism; Bruno of Querfurt accused Sarolt of mixing Christian and heathen practices. However, Géza launched military campaigns against the pagan chieftains, promoting Christianity and stabilizing central authority in parallel. The development of the ecclesiastical structure during Géza's reign is unknown. The earliest charter of grant to the Benedictine Pannonhalma Abbey states that Géza ordered its establishment.

King St Stephen 

Géza died in 997, leaving Hungary to his devout Christian son, Stephen. Stephen had married Gisela of Bavaria, a relative of the Holy Roman Emperor Otto III. His kinsman, Koppány, challenged his right to rule, but Stephen's heavy cavalry, mainly Bavarian and Swabian knights, overcame Koppány. To demonstrate his right to rule by the grace of God, Stephen requested a royal crown from Emperor Otto or Pope Sylvester II. His request was granted and he was crowned the first king of Hungary on 25December 1000 or 1January 1001.

Stephen started the systematic Christianization of Hungary. He established at least eight bishoprics and six monasteries, making magnanimous grants to them. Evidently founded before Stephen's coronation, the see of Veszprém was the first Catholic bishopric. The Archbishopric of Esztergom was established in 1001. Whether Kalocsa was set up as a second archbishopric without suffragan bishops, or as a bishopric is uncertain. Stephen founded the Benedictine monasteries at Pécsvárad, Zalavár, Bakonybél and Somlóvásárhely. He ordered the collection of the tithe, a church tax, for the clergy, and opened Hungary for pilgrims travelling to the Holy Land.

Christianity could not spread without the application of state violence. Stephen outlawed pagan practices and prescribed the adoption of a Christian way of life. Bruno of Querfurt witnessed how Christian soldiers blinded many of the Black Hungariansan ethnic group in southern Hungaryto enforce their baptism. Stephen's first laws ordered the observation of feast days and fasts and the punishment of those who disturbed the mass by murmuring. The pagans were regularly baptized before their formal education of the Christian doctrines began. Written sources recorded the activities of Slavic, German and Italian missionaries. Bruno of Querfurt met with Adalbert of Prague's tutor, Radla, and one of Adalbert's disciples, Astrik, in Hungary. Bruno's own mission among the Black Hungarians was unsuccessful. A Venetian monk, Gerard, who was consecrated the first bishop of Csanád in 1030, proselytized in the Banat. The longer version of his Life describe him preaching among the pagan Hungarians who were brought to him by royal officials, with seven monks acting as his interpreters.

The first priests were foreigners. Bonipert, the first bishop of Pécs, came from France or Lombardy; one of his priests, Hilduin, was a Frenchman; the hermits Zoerard and Benedict were born in Poland or Istria. Hungarian liturgy followed southern German, Lotharingian and northern Italian patterns. The first native cleric known by name, Maurus, was consecrated as bishop of Pécs in 1036. Stephen's first laws mention priests acting together with the ispáns (or heads) of the counties, implying that the first parishes were established in county seats. His second law book prescribed that every ten villages were to build a church, but a fully developed parish system cannot be documented for centuries. The earliest churches, mainly made of wood or wattle-and-daub, were built in or near fortresses. Stone churches mainly followed Italian patterns (as it is demonstrated by the Acanthus spinosa carved on the chapiters of the columns in the Romanesque Veszprém Cathedral).

Latin literacy started in Hungary during Stephen's reign. Bishop Fulbert of Chartres sent a copy of Priscian's Institutes of Grammara popular handbook of Latinto Bonipert of Pécs around 1020. An unidentified foreign cleric wrote a king's mirror, known as Admonitions, for Stephen's son and heir, Emeric, in the 1020s. Gerard of Csanád completed his Deliberatio in Hungary.

Orthodox communities existed in Stephen's kingdom. He (or his father) established a monastery for Byzantine nuns in Veszprémvölgy. One of his opponents, Ajtony, who ruled the Banat, converted to Orthodoxy and established a monastery for Greek monks at his seat. After Stephen's troops conquered Ajtony's domains, the monks were transferred to a new monastery, built for them. Archaeologists assume that pectoral crosses found in almost thirty 11th-century graves reflect the dead's Orthodox faith. Byzantine documents made sporadic references to "metropolitan bishops of Tourkia", proving the existence of a titular Hungarian Orthodox metropolitanate for more than a century.

The Admonitions and Gerard's Deliberatio wrote of anti-Trinitarians, presenting them as a serious problem for Catholic missions in Hungary. Gerard described them as heretics who denied the resurrection of the dead and threatened the Church's position with the assistance of the "followers of Methodius". Modern historians propose that these "heretics" were Bogumil refugees from Bulgaria or local Christians converted by non-Catholic missionaries.

Revolts and consolidation 

StephenI who survived his son appointed his sister's son, the Venetian Peter Orseolo as his heir. To secure Peter's position, Stephen ordered the mutilation of his cousin, Vazul, who inclined towards paganism. Vazul's three sons, Levente, Andrew and Béla, were forced into exile. Peter succeeded Stephen in 1038. He distrusted the native aristocrats and replaced them with Germans and Italians. The neglected lords dethroned him and elected one of their number, Samuel Aba, king, but the Holy Roman Emperor, Henry III, invaded Hungary and restored Peter. Peter swore fealty to the Emperor and introduced Bavarian laws.

Peter remained unpopular and a group of discontented aristocrats offered the throne to Vazul's exiled sons in 1046. Before the three dukes returned to Hungary, a popular uprising began. The Annales Altahenses described the rebels as pagans who murdered clerics and foreigners. Bishop Gerald of Csanád, thrown from the hill now bearing his name to the Danube, was one of their victims. They captured and blinded the King, paving the way for Vazul's sons. The eldest of them, Levente, whom the Hungarian chronicles described as a pagan, died unexpectedly. The three bishops who survived the uprising crowned his Christian younger brother, Andrew, king. The Annales Altahenses accused him of anti-Christian acts during the revolt, but as king he restored StephenI's decrees, outlawing paganism. AndrewI was dethroned by his brother, Béla. BélaI held a general assembly, summoning two elders from each village to Székesfehérvár in 1061. The assembled commoners put pressure on him to expel the priests from the country, but he dissolved the meeting by force.

Dynastic conflicts continued, but the position of Christianity consolidated in Hungary. Archaeological finds reveal the general adoption of Christian customs by around 1100. Grave goods disappeared and churches were built in pagan cemeteries. New Benedictine and Orthodox monasteries were established by the monarchs. Otto from the Győr kindred was the first aristocrat to found a Benedictine family monastery at Zselicszentjakab in 1061. Cathedral chapters became important institutions of education. The parishes in the dioceses were grouped into deaneries, each headed by a senior cleric, by around 1100.

BélaI's son, Ladislaus I, took Draconian measures for the protection of property rights, even ignoring the idea of church asylum. His laws also dealt with the local Muslim and Jewish communities. He forbade Muslims who had converted to Christianity to return to their old faith and ordered the Jews to abandon their Christian wives and to dismiss their Christian servants. Ladislaus supported Popes Victor III and Urban II against Antipope Clement III during the first phase of the Investiture Controversy. He procured the canonization of the first Hungarian saintsKing StephenI, Prince Emeric, Bishop Gerard and the hermits Zoerard and Benedictin 1083. He summoned the Hungarian prelates to synod at Szabolcs in 1091. The synod forbade the village communities to abandon the land where their church stood, but authorized the villagers to elect one of their number to represent them at the Sunday mass if their village was far away from the church. The synod allowed the married priests to live with their wives in clear contradiction with the idea of clerical celibacy, promoted by the Gregorian Reform.

LadislausI's nephew and successor, Coloman the Learned, had to deal with the problems that the armies of the First Crusade caused during their march across Hungary towards the Holy Land in 1096. He defeated and massacred two crusader hordes to prevent their pillaging raids, but allowed Godfrey of Bouillon and his troops to cross Hungary after Godfrey offered his brother, Baldwin, as a hostage to guarantee his troops' good conduct. Coloman renounced the right of appointing the bishops, but in practice the cathedral chapters continued to elect the monarchs' nominees as bishops. His decrees toned down the harshness of his predecessors' laws. The preamble to his law-code described Hungary as a fully converted Christian realm, but his decree ordering burials in graveyards shows that this was not a general practice. He ordered the Muslims to build Christian churches, to eat pork and to marry off their daughters to Christians, showing his intention to assimilate the local Muslim communities. The Esztergom synod of the Hungarian prelates prohibited the monks from preaching, baptizing and offering absolution to sinners.

Catholic heyday 

Burials outside churchyards disappeared early in the 12thcentury. Large three-aisled basilicas with two towers were built at the episcopal sees. Churches built at lay landowners' estates played an important role in the development of parishes. They were either single-naved churches or rotundas. The aristocrats regarded these churches as part of their patrimony and freely appointed their priests.

Most churches were dedicated to the Virgin Mary, George of Lydda, the Archangel Michael, Martin of Tours, Nicholas of Myra, and Peter the Apostle, but the first Hungarian saints' cult quickly spread after their canonization. The first Cistercian and the Premonstratensian monasteries were established in the 1140s. The monarchs preferred the Cistercians, but the aristocrats founded Premonstratensian houses. King Géza II settled the Knights Hospitaller and Templar in the country and established a Hungarian order of hospitaller canons in honor of King St Stephen.

Hungarian clerics studied in the universities of Paris and Oxford from the 1150s. They were mostly canons who financed their studies from the income of their prebends in collegiate chapters. The use of written records spread. The collegiate chapters and major monasteries played an important role in the process as "places of authentication", providing notary services from around 1200. The first extant religious text in Hungariana burial speechwas written around 1200.

GézaII concluded a concordat with Pope Alexander III. Géza's right to dismiss bishops or transfer them from a see to another was abolished, but he was authorized to deliver the pallium to the archbishops and to control correspondence between the Hungarian prelates and the Holy See. Géza's son and successor, Stephen III, renounced the right to appoint the abbots of the royal monasteries and to administer the goods of vacant bishoprics. When Stephen died in 1172, his younger brother, Béla, succeeded him. Lucas, Archbishop of Esztergom, denied to crown him, but the Pope authorized the archbishop of Kalocsa to perform the ceremony. Lucas referred to Béla's alleged simony to explain his resistance, but he most probably feared of the influence of the Orthodox Church Béla who had grewn up in the Byzantine Empire. Schism between the Catholic and Orthodox Churches had deepened. BélaIII could not introduce the cult of the Bulgarian hermit John of Rila in Hungary. Job, Archbishop of Esztergom, entered into an unfriendly correspondence with the Byzantine Emperor Isaac II Angelos about the differences between Catholic and Orthodox theologies. Béla's elder son and successor, Emeric, proposed Pope Innocent III to appoint a Catholic bishop to administer the Greek monasteries in Hungary in 1204. He did not achieve his goal, but the Greek monasteries disappeared during the following decades.

BélaIII and his successors adopted an active foreign policy, often in close alliance with the Papacy. Emeric waged a war against Ban Kulin of Bosnia whom Pope InnocentIII regarded as the Bogumils' main protector. Emeric's brother, Andrew II, launched a crusade to the Holy Land in 1217–1218. Andrew's son, Béla IV, supported the Dominicans' missions among the Cumans of the Pontic steppes. The mendicant orders settled in Hungary in the 1220s. In contrast with the traditional monastic orders, the mendicants willingly mingled with the common people to spread Christian ideas. One of the eight initial provinces of the Dominicans was set up in Hungary. Friar Paulus Hungarus, who had taught Roman law at the university of Bologna, returned to his homeland to found the first Dominican priories in 1221. The Franciscans came to Hungary in 1229.

AndrewII made generous grants to the aristocrats, threatening the social position of the royal servants and castle warriors (small landholders who had been directly subject to the monarch or his officials). The latter forced the monarch to summarize their liberties in a royal charter, known as the Golden Bull of 1222. The Golden Bull also confirmed the clerics' exemption of royal taxes, but limited the prelates' right to trade in salt and prohibited the collection of the tithe in cash. The clerics' liberties were summarized in a separate document, most probably around the end of 1222. The King confirmed that only ecclesiastical courts could sit in judgement on clerics, but it also prohibited the ordination of serfs as priests.

AndrewII employed Jews and Muslims in the administration of royal revenues, outraging the prelates and Pope HonoriusIII. The Pope authorized Robert, Archbishop of Esztergom to apply ecclesiastical sanctions against the King in 1231. AndrewII was forced to re-issue the Golden Bull, but without the articles that prejudged the interests of the Church. The new document exempted the prelates' estates of the jurisdiction of the ispáns and established the monopoly of ecclesiastical courts in matters relating to marriage and dowry. It also authorized the archbishop of Esztergom to excommunicate the monarch if he did not respect its articles. Arcbhbishop Robert placed Hungary under interdict for the employment of Muslims in state administration and the Pope sent a legate to negotiate with AndrewII. Their compromise was summarized in a treaty which obliged the King to dismiss his Muslim and Jewish officials and to enable the prelates to trade in salt.

The Dominican Friar Julian learnt of the Mongols' plan to invade Europe during his mission among the Eastern Magyars (a pagan people on the Volga) in 1236. The Mongols forced thousands of pagan Cumans to seek refuge in Hungary in 1240. The Mongols stormed into Hungary and defeated the royal army in the Battle of Muhi on 11April 1241. The Mongols devastated the country for a year, but they withdrew without leaving garrisons behind. Hungary survived the Mongol occupation and BélaIV introduced measures to strengthen the defence system. He urged the wealthiest landowners, both the laymen and the prelates, to build stone castles.

The position of the archbishops of Esztergom strengthened. BélaIV authorized the archbishop to supervise royal coinage. He also enabled the noblemen to will their estates to the archbishopric and to enter into the archbishop's service. Béla's successor, Stephen V prevented the archbishop's noble warriors from demanding the privileges of the "true nobles of the realm". Stephen granted Esztergom County to the archbishops, making them its perpetual ispán.

Asceticism and the development of eremitical communities was an eminent feature of the spiritual life in the 13th century. A canon of Esztergom, Eusebius, settled in the woods of the Pilis Hills to live as a hermit in 1246. Ascetics joined him and their community developed into the new order of hermits, known as Paulines during the following decades. The Dominicans lost favour with BélaIV after his daughter, Margaret, who was a Dominican nun, refused to marry, ruining his plan of a marriage alliance. Béla thereafter supported the Franciscans who established more than forty priories during the following decades.

See also
History of the Catholic Church in Hungary
Protestantism in Hungary

Notes

References

Sources 

 
Catholic Church in Hungary
Eastern Christianity in Hungary
Protestantism in Hungary